Spell 31 is the third studio album by Afro-French Cuban sibling duo Ibeyi, released on 6 May 2022, by XL Recordings.

Track listing

Personnel 
 Lisa-Kaïndé Diaz – vocals
 Naomi Diaz – vocals, percussion, arranger (1, 4-10)
 Richard Russell – producer, arranger (4, 6-8)
 Pa Salieu – vocals (3, 7)
 Jorja Smith – vocals (8)
 Berwyn – vocals (9)
 Joe Brown – recording engineer, instrumental performance (7, 8)
 Ricky Damian – mixing engineer
 Eg White – instrumental performance (5)
 Owen Pallett – arranger, instrumental performance (5)
 Ben Reed – arranger (6), instrumental performance (4-7)
 Dave Okumu – instrumental performance (4)
 Maya Dagnino – instrumental performance (7)
 CASisDEAD – instrumental performance (9)

References 

2022 albums
Ibeyi albums
XL Recordings albums
Albums produced by Richard Russell